Medonte may refer to:

Medonte Township
Medonte (Mysliveček)
Medonte, re di Epiro